Grass Roots is a studio album by American pianist Andrew Hill featuring performances recorded in 1968 and released on the Blue Note label. The original album features Hill with trumpeter Lee Morgan, tenor saxophonist Booker Ervin, bassist Ron Carter and drummer Freddie Waits performing five of his originals. The 2000 CD reissue added alternate versions of three of the pieces (and two additional compositions) recorded by a sextet with trumpeter Woody Shaw, tenor saxophonist Frank Mitchell, guitarist Jimmy Ponder, bassist Reggie Workman and drummer Idris Muhammad at an earlier session as bonus tracks.

Reception
The Allmusic review by Stephen Thomas Erlewine awarded the album 4 stars stating "the songs have strong melodies, even hooks, to bring casual listeners in, but they give the musicians the freedom to find a distinctive voice in their solos".

Track listing
All compositions by Andrew Hill

 "Grass Roots" - 5:41
 "Venture Inward" - 4:46
 "Mira" - 6:20
 "Soul Special" - 8:22
 "Bayou Red" - 7:45
 "MC" - 9:11 Bonus track on CD reissue
 "Venture Inward" [First Version] - 4:34 Bonus track on CD reissue
 "Soul Special" [First Version] - 8:51 Bonus track on CD reissue
 "Bayou Red" [First Version] - 5:59 Bonus track on CD reissue
 "Love Nocturne" - 7:33 Bonus track on CD reissue

Personnel
Andrew Hill - piano
Lee Morgan (tracks 1–5), Woody Shaw (tracks 6–10) - trumpet
Booker Ervin (tracks 1–5), Frank Mitchell (tracks 6–10) - tenor saxophone
Jimmy Ponder - guitar (tracks 6–10)
Ron Carter (tracks 1–5), Reggie Workman (tracks 6–10) - bass
Idris Muhammad (tracks 6–10), Freddie Waits (tracks 1–5) - drums

References

Blue Note Records albums
Andrew Hill albums
1968 albums
Albums recorded at Van Gelder Studio
Albums produced by Francis Wolff